Divine Proportions (born 13 March 2002 in Kentucky) is a champion Thoroughbred race horse and winner of two French classics.

Background
Divine Proportions was bred by the Niarchos family. She was sired by the American-bred stallion Kingmambo. Her dam Myth to Reality, was a Group 3 winning daughter of Sadler's Wells.

Racing career
During her racing career, ridden by Christophe Lemaire and trained by Pascal Bary, Divine Proportions was the winner of no fewer than five Group 1 races, including the Poule d'Essai des Pouliches and the Prix de Diane.  She won nine out of her ten races before being retired after sustaining a tendon injury following her only defeat (4th place) in the  Group 1 Prix Jacques Le Marois. Her consistent performances at the highest level led to her being voted the Cartier Three-Year-Old European Champion Filly in 2005, following on from another such high accolade, when in 2004 she was awarded the Cartier's best 2 year old award.

In 2006 Divine Proportions was mated to Champion Sire Giant's Causeway and produced a bay colt. The colt was named Eightfold Path and won the Prix Eclipse in 2009. In 2007, she was mated to A.P. Indy

Breeding record
2007 Eightfold Path (USA) : Bay colt, foaled 1 February, by Giant's Causeway (USA) - won 4 races, including G3 Prix Eclipse at Chantilly; LR Grand Handicap de Deauville, and placed 3 times, including 3rd G3 Prix La Rochette at Longchamp, from 13 starts in France 2009-2012 

2010 Daivika (USA) : Bay filly, foaled 14 April, by Dynaformer (USA) - no wins in 2 starts.

2011 Monoceros (USA) : Bay colt, foaled 26 April, by Giant's Causeway (USA) - won 1 minor race from 6 starts.

2014 Diodorus (IRE) : Bay colt, foaled 9 May, by Galileo (IRE) - won 1 minor from 22 starts on the flat and all-weather, was sent hurdling for one season won 1 novice hurdle from 9 starts.

2016 Nefertiti (IRE) : Bay filly, foaled 12 February, by Galileo (IRE) - unraced.

2017 Numen (IRE) : Chestnut colt, foaled 7 March, by Galileo (IRE) - 1 minor win from 4 starts.

2018 Light Of My Eyes (IRE) : Bay filly, foaled 24 May, by Frankel (GB) - no wins from 2 minor races.

See also
List of leading Thoroughbred racehorses

References
 Divine Proportions pedigree and racing stats

2002 racehorse births
Racehorses bred in Kentucky
Racehorses trained in France
French Thoroughbred Classic Race winners
Cartier Award winners
Thoroughbred family 1-l